Call of the Blood AKA Sinful Blood is a 1929 Czech-German silent film directed by Victor Trivas and starring Vera Voronina, Jan Sviták, and Oskar Marion. The film is considered lost.

Cast
 Vera Voronina as Věra
 Jan Sviták as Salto
 Oskar Marion as Oskar
 Feodor Chaliapin Jr. as Fred
 George Seroff as Jiří (Georg)

References

External links

1929 films
Films of the Weimar Republic
Films directed by Victor Trivas
German silent feature films
Czech silent feature films
German black-and-white films
1920s German-language films